Public Hero ﹟1 is a 1935 American crime film starring Lionel Barrymore, Jean Arthur, Chester Morris and Joseph Calleia. The Metro-Goldwyn-Mayer production was directed by J. Walter Ruben.

Plot
Undercover FBI agent Jeff Crane is planted in the same prison as Sonny Black, who is suspected of belonging to the notorious Purple Gang. Jeff helps Sonny escape in the hope that he will lead Jeff to the rest of the gang.

Sonny is seriously wounded during the escape. Once the fugitives reach his home in central Wisconsin, he sends Jeff for Dr. Josiah Glass, an alcoholic who has saved the lives of many of the gang members. In his rush, Jeff forces a bus off the road during a late-night rainstorm. One of the passengers, Maria Theresa "Terry" O'Reilly, badgers him until he takes the stranded people back to town. However, he refuses Terry's persistent requests that he drive her to her destination, only a few miles away.

Jeff finds Dr. Glass, but has to wait, as the storm has made a bridge impassible. During that time, he and Terry become acquainted. He learns that she is going to see her brother "Dinkie". She has not seen him in many years, and he has not responded to her letter about his inheritance from their uncle. Jeff is shocked when he sees a photograph of her brother: Dinkie is Sonny. Terry is unaware of Sonny's criminal activity.

When Jeff takes Dr. Glass to Sonny, Terry stows away in the car. She meets Sonny, and learns that he is the subject of a nationwide manhunt. However, family ties are strong, and she helps nurse him back to health. Later, when Sonny slaps Terry for persistently trying to persuade him to turn himself in, Jeff cannot control himself. He punches Sonny. Sonny angrily orders Jeff and Terry to leave, at gunpoint.

Jeff's boss, Special Agent James Duff, had warned Jeff not to get involved with Terry. The whole operation seems to be derailed, so Duff fires Jeff.

However, Jeff has an idea. Knowing that the gang is planning to strike that day, he tricks Dr. Glass into taking him to their hideout, a roadhouse named Little Paree. He notifies Duff, who arranges an ambush. A fierce gunfight ensues. All of the gang members are killed except Sonny, who escapes. A dying Dr. Glass confirms that Sonny was the boss.

Weeks go by, but Sonny eludes capture. A newspaper publishes photographs of Sonny and Jeff side by side—one captioned "Public Enemy No. 1", and the other "Public Hero No. 1". Duff and Jeff learn that Sonny has undergone plastic surgery. Knowing that he must be short of money, they place an advertisement supposedly from Terry offering to provide Dinkie with money. His sister is placed under surveillance at the vaudeville theater where she is the cashier. Sure enough, he approaches her for money at the theater and is spotted. Terry warns him, but he is gunned down in an alley by Jeff.(Several critics have noted the similarity between Sonny's death scene and the killing of John Dillinger outside the Biograph Theater in Chicago.)

Afterwards, Terry wants nothing to do with her brother's killer. However, Jeff corners her on a train and they reconcile.

Cast
 Lionel Barrymore as Doctor
 Jean Arthur as Maria Theresa "Terry" O'Reilly
 Chester Morris as Jeff Crane
 Joseph Calleia as "Dinkie" O'Reilly aka "Sonny" Black
 Paul Kelly as Duff
 Lewis Stone as Warden
 Paul Hurst as Rufe Parker
 George E. Stone as Butch
 Sam Baker as Mose

Reception

New York Times film critic Andre Sennwald called Public Hero ﹟1 "a rattling good show, equally effective in its snarling violence and in its humor", and cited Joseph Calleia's  portrayal of the gunman as one of the year's ten best male performances. Writing for The Spectator, Graham Greene described the film as "a conventional but exciting film" and gave specific praise for the acting skills of Chester Morris and Lionel Barrymore whom Greene suggested had given "one of the best performances of his career". Greene's only criticism for the film was that its romantic situation had "spoilt … the realistic subject of 'men on a job'".

Home media
On October 13, 2015, Public Hero ﹟1 was released on Region 1 DVD (manufactured on demand) by the Warner Archive Collection.

Remake
Public Hero ﹟1 was remade in 1941 as The Get-Away, starring Robert Sterling, Dan Dailey and Donna Reed. Edward Buzzell directed the MGM film, which was produced by J. Walter Ruben, director of the original film.

See also
 Lionel Barrymore filmography

References

External links 
 
 
 
 
 Public Hero ﹟1 at TV Guide (a shortened and revised version of 1987 write-up originally published in The Motion Picture Guide)
 Program note by William K. Everson for his March 1, 1985 screening at The New School

1935 films
American black-and-white films
1935 romantic drama films
1935 crime drama films
American crime drama films
Metro-Goldwyn-Mayer films
American prison films
American romantic drama films
Films set in Wisconsin
Films about Jewish-American organized crime
The Purple Gang
Films scored by Edward Ward (composer)
Films directed by J. Walter Ruben
1930s English-language films
1930s American films